Mouloudia Club de Saïda, known as MC Saïda or simply MCS for short, is an Algerian football club based in the city of Saïda. The club was founded in 1947 and its colours are green, red and white. Their home stadium, Saïd Amara Stadium, has a capacity of 20,000 spectators. The club is currently playing in the Algerian Ligue 2.

Honors
Algerian Cup: 1
 1965

Algerian Championnat National 2: 1
 2009–10

Current squad

Notable players
Below are the notable former players who have represented MC Saïda in league and international competition since the club's foundation in 1947. To appear in the section below, a player must have played in at least 100 official matches for the club or represented the national team for which the player is eligible during his stint with MC Saïda or following his departure.

For a complete list of MC Saïda players, see :Category:MC Saïda players

 Cheikh Hamidi
 Abdelkrim Kerroum
 Mohamed Seguer
 Abdou Rahman Dampha

References

External links
 Fiche MC Saïda

MC Saïda
Football clubs in Algeria
Association football clubs established in 1947
Saïda Province
Algerian Ligue Professionnelle 1 clubs
1947 establishments in Algeria
Sports clubs in Algeria